Abroma is a genus of cicadas in the family Cicadidae. There are at least 20 described species in Abroma.

Species
These 22 species belong to the genus Abroma:

 Abroma antandroyae Boulard, 2008 c g
 Abroma apicalis Ollenbach, 1929 c g
 Abroma apicifera (Walker, F., 1850) c g
 Abroma bengalensis Distant, 1906 c g
 Abroma bowringi Distant, 1905 c g
 Abroma canopea Boulard, 2007 c g
 Abroma cincturae Boulard, 2009 c g
 Abroma egae (Distant, 1892) i c g
 Abroma ferraria (Stal, 1870) c g
 Abroma guerinii (Signoret, 1860) c g
 Abroma impatiens Boulard, 2013 c g
 Abroma inaudibilis Boulard, 1999 c g
 Abroma maculicollis (Guerin-Meneville, 1838) c g
 Abroma mameti Boulard, 1979 c g
 Abroma minor Jacobi, 1917 c g
 Abroma nubifurca (Walker, F., 1858) c g
 Abroma orhanti Boulard, 2008 c g
 Abroma philippinensis Distant, 1905 c g
 Abroma reducta (Jacobi, 1902) c g
 Abroma tahanensis Moulton, J.C., 1923 c g
 Abroma temperata (Walker, 1858) i c g
 Abroma vinsoni Boulard, 1979 c g

Data sources: i = ITIS, c = Catalogue of Life, g = GBIF, b = Bugguide.net

References

Further reading

 
 
 
 
 
 

Lamotialnini
Cicadidae genera